Sivabalan is a basketball player from Tamil Nadu, India. He has played for both junior and senior national Basketball teams. He is currently the captain of Chennai Customs basketball team, Chennai. He earlier played for Indian Overseas Bank, Chennai. He hails from Sivaganga district, Tamil Nadu. He is the product of SDAT. He was a student of Loyola College, Chennai.

References

Indian men's volleyball players
Tamil sportspeople
Living people
Year of birth missing (living people)
Volleyball players from Tamil Nadu